The following is a comprehensive discography of Hawk Nelson, a Canadian rock band. The band has released eight studio albums.

Albums

Studio albums

Independent albums
As SWISH

Released under the band name, SWISH

Compilation albums

EPs

Singles

 "The Great Unknown" was only on the deluxe edition of Diamonds.

Song appearances on compilations

Music videos

Notes

References

Rock music group discographies
Discographies of Canadian artists
Christian music discographies